Otto Matthäus Zykan  (29 April 1935, Vienna – 25 May 2006, Sachsendorf, Burgschleinitz-Kühnring) was an Austrian composer and pianist.

He studied at the Vienna Music Academy,  where his teachers included Karl Schiske (composition), Bruno Seidlhofer and Josef Dichler (piano). He also attended the Darmstadt summer courses (1958, 1964–1966), winning the Kranichstein Music Prize of the international piano competition on his first visit. Zykan's most characteristic works are his ‘total art productions’, in which processes of permutation extend to movement, sounds and linguistic elements alike, sometimes producing compromise and sometimes distortion, and often reducing critical comment to the absurd. As his creative work has been conceived entirely in relation to the present, a number of his works exist only in a sketch-like draft form. He has mostly dispensed with publication, since the majority of his works depend on his personal interpretation. As a result, a number of compositions have been lost. He has also created TV advertisements for well-known firms. Among his works are three operas, 1966's Singers Nähmaschine ist die beste, 1980's Kunst kommt von Gönnen and Auszählreim of 1986.

References 

 OperaGlass page (cached)

1935 births
2006 deaths
20th-century Austrian composers
20th-century Austrian male musicians
20th-century classical composers
20th-century pianists
Austrian classical composers
Austrian opera composers
Male opera composers
Austrian pianists
Musicians from Vienna
Austrian male classical composers
Male pianists
21st-century Austrian musicians
21st-century classical composers
21st-century pianists
21st-century male musicians